Kalateh-ye Hajj Ali (also Romanized as Kalāteh-ye Ḩājj ‘Alī; also known as Ḩoseynābād, Kalāteh-ye Ḩājjī ‘Alī, and Kalāteh-ye Ḩoseynābād) is a village in Pain Velayat Rural District, Razaviyeh District, Mashhad County, Razavi Khorasan Province, Iran. At the 2006 census, its population was 108, in 30 families.

References 

Populated places in Mashhad County